F.H.G.M. (Frans) Ronnes (16 October 1948 – 12 June 2017) was a Dutch politician. He was a member of the Christian Democratic Appeal (Christen-Democratisch Appèl). From 2001 to 2013 he was mayor of the municipality of Haaren.

Ronnes was born 16 October 1948 in the village of Vierlingsbeek, North Brabant. From 1998 to 2001 he was an alderman of the municipality of Bernheze. Both municipalities are situated in the province of North Brabant. In October 2014, he assumed the post of interim mayor of 
Laarbeek after Hans Obachs left office, which he held until his cancer diagnosis in 2016.
He was the president of the Charter of European Rural Communities. Ronnes died on 12 June 2017 after a battle with prostate cancer.

His sons Gijs (born 1977) and Bram (born 1978) are beach volleyball players.

References 

Reappointment mayor Ronnes, Haaren website

External links 
 Mayor Frans Ronnes, Haaren website 

1948 births
2017 deaths
Christian Democratic Appeal politicians
Mayors in North Brabant
People from Haaren, North Brabant
Aldermen in North Brabant
People from Boxmeer
Deaths from cancer in the Netherlands
Deaths from prostate cancer